Eljigidey was khan of the Chagatai Khanate, a division of the Mongol Empire in 1326–1329. He was the son of Duwa. After the death of his brother Kebek, Eljigidey took control of the Chagatai Khanate. He was involved in the succession struggles of the Yuan court from 1327 to 1329. His ally Kusala was enthroned as the Yuan emperor in 1329, but died suspiciously soon after that. The new Yuan emperor, Tugh Temür sent him Naimantai, a descendant of Muqali, in order to mollify his anger with an imperial seal. After only a short period of time, however, Eljigidey was overthrown by another brother, Duwa Temür.

References 

"The Chaghadaids and Islam: the conversion of Tarmashirin Khan (1331-34)".  The Journal of the American Oriental Society, October 1, 2002. Biran
The Cambridge History of China By Denis Twitchett, Herbert Franke, John K. Fairbank

Chagatai khans
14th-century monarchs in Asia
Year of birth unknown
1329 deaths